Csipkerek is a village in Vas County, Hungary.

References

External links 
 Street map (Hungarian)

Populated places in Vas County